Hassan Yousuf Mudhafar Al-Gheilani (born 26 June 1980), commonly known as Hassan Mudhafar, is an Omani former footballer who plays for Al-Oruba SC in Oman Professional League.

Club career
On 15 June 2013, he signed a one-year contract with Saham SC. On 13 July 2014, he signed a one-year contract with his first most club Al-Oruba SC.

Club career statistics

International career

Gulf Cup of Nations
Hassan has made appearances in the 2003 Gulf Cup of Nations, the 2004 Gulf Cup of Nations, the 2007 Gulf Cup of Nations, the 2009 Gulf Cup of Nations, the 2010 Gulf Cup of Nations and the 2013 Gulf Cup of Nations.

His only goal in the Gulf Cup of Nations came in the 2004 Gulf Cup of Nations in a 2-1 win over the United Arab Emirates hence helping his country to reach the semi-finals and then the finals of the Gulf Cup of Nations for the first time. But Oman lost in the final to the hosts, Qatar in a penalty shootout after the goalkeeping sensation Ali Al-Habsi missed a penalty. Qatar won the match 6-5 on penalties after the match had ended 1-1 at normal time. Amad Al-Hosni was awarded the "Top Goal Scorer" award of the competition with a total of four goals.

AFC Asian Cup
Hassan has made appearances in the 2004 AFC Asian Cup qualification, the 2004 AFC Asian Cup, the 2007 AFC Asian Cup qualification, the 2007 AFC Asian Cup, the 2011 AFC Asian Cup qualification and the 2015 AFC Asian Cup qualification.

He scored a well-remembered goal in 2007 AFC Asian Cup qualification in a 2-1 win over the United Arab Emirates hence helping his team to qualify for the 2007 AFC Asian Cup. Badar Al-Maimani scored one and the only goal of Oman in the 2007 AFC Asian Cup in a 1-1 draw against Australia. In the tournament, Oman won two points in a 1-1 draw against Australia and in a 0-0 draw against Iraq and hence failed to qualify for the quarter-finals.

FIFA World Cup Qualification
Hassan has made six appearances in the 2006 FIFA World Cup qualification, seven in the 2010 FIFA World Cup qualification and nine in the 2014 FIFA World Cup qualification.

His only goal for Oman in FIFA World Cup qualification came in the First Round of FIFA World Cup qualification in a 2-0 win over Nepal.

Retirement
On 22 May 2015, after captaining the winning side, Al-Oruba SC in the 2014-15 Sultan Qaboos Cup, Hassan announced his retirement from  international football with a record of 111 appearances.

National team career statistics

Goals for Senior National Team
Scores and results list Oman's goal tally first.

Honours

Club
With Al Wahda
UAE Pro-League (1): 2009-10

With Al-Ettifaq
Saudi Crown Prince Cup Runner-up: 2011-12

With Dhofar
Omani Super Cup Runner-up: 2012

See also
 List of men's footballers with 100 or more international caps

References

External links
 
 
 Hassan Mudhafar at Goal.com
 
 
 Hassan Mudhafar Al-Gheilani - ASIAN CUP Australia 2015

1980 births
Living people
People from Sur, Oman
Omani footballers
Oman international footballers
Omani expatriate footballers
Association football defenders
2004 AFC Asian Cup players
2007 AFC Asian Cup players
2015 AFC Asian Cup players
FIFA Century Club
Al-Orouba SC players
Al Ahli SC (Doha) players
Al Salmiya SC players
Al-Rayyan SC players
Al Wahda FC players
Ettifaq FC players
Dhofar Club players
Saham SC players
Qatar Stars League players
Saudi Professional League players
UAE Pro League players
Oman Professional League players
Omani expatriate sportspeople in Qatar
Expatriate footballers in Qatar
Expatriate footballers in Kuwait
Omani expatriate sportspeople in Kuwait
Expatriate footballers in the United Arab Emirates
Omani expatriate sportspeople in the United Arab Emirates
Expatriate footballers in Saudi Arabia
Omani expatriate sportspeople in Saudi Arabia
Footballers at the 2002 Asian Games
Footballers at the 2006 Asian Games
Asian Games competitors for Oman
Kuwait Premier League players